Žilina is municipality and village in Kladno District in the Central Bohemian Region of the Czech Republic. It has about 800 inhabitants.

Notable people
Josef Horešovský (born 1946), ice hockey player

References

Villages in Kladno District